Waseda-SAT2 is a Japanese satellite which launched in May 2010. It is a student-built spacecraft, which will be operated by Waseda University, and is intended to be used for Earth observation and technology demonstration. It will test the use of extendible paddles to provide attitude control. The satellite is a single unit CubeSat.

The launch was conducted by Mitsubishi Heavy Industries under contract to the Japan Aerospace Exploration Agency.  In preparation for a planned launch on 17 May, the H-IIA rocket was rolled out to Pad 1 of the Yoshinobu Launch Complex at the Tanegashima Space Centre on 16 May 2010. It departed the assembly building at 21:01 UTC and arriving at the launch pad 24 minutes later at 21:25 UTC. The terminal countdown began at 11:30 UTC on 17 May and by 15:28, the loading of cryogenic propellant into the rocket's first and second stages had been completed. The launch attempt was scrubbed a few minutes before liftoff due to bad weather, but took place successfully at 21:58:22 UTC on 20 May 2010.

Waseda was deployed from a JAXA Picosatellite Deployer attached to the second stage of the H-IIA 202 rocket used in the launch of the Akatsuki spacecraft towards Venus. A second dispenser contained K-Sat and the Negai ☆ satellite. The three CubeSats separated into low Earth orbit during a coast phase of the launch, between the first and second burns of the second stage. The rocket then continued to Heliocentric orbit, where it deployed Akatsuki, along with the IKAROS and UNITEC-1 spacecraft.

See also

WASEDA-SAT-ZERO
List of CubeSats

References

Satellites of Japan
Spacecraft launched in 2010
Student satellites
CubeSats
Waseda University
Spacecraft which reentered in 2010
Spacecraft launched by H-II rockets